Thomas David Allan (born 23 September 1999) is an English professional footballer who plays as a forward for Gateshead on loan at Spennymoor Town

Newcastle loaned Allan to Accrington Stanley during the first part of the 2020–21 season, and then to Greenock Morton in August 2021, but was recalled in January 2022. He Joined Gateshead in June </ref> |url=https://gateshead-fc.com/tom-allan-signs/ |publisher=Gateshead F.C |access-date=16th June 2022}}</ref> scoring on his 2nd game against Notts County with the game finishing 1-1. Then in September 2022 he joined Spennymoor Town on loan in a deal due to run to the New Year. Allan scored his first goal for the moors against Brackley Town resulting in a 2-1 Defeat.

Career statistics

Club

References

1999 births
Living people
Footballers from Newcastle upon Tyne
English footballers
Newcastle United F.C. players
Accrington Stanley F.C. players
Greenock Morton F.C. players
Gateshead F.C. players
Association football forwards
English Football League players